Investors Bank was a publicly traded, full-service bank that was based in Short Hills, New Jersey, USA. The bank operated over 150 branches across New Jersey and New York. In February 2023, Investors Bank merged with Citizens Financial Group.

History 
In 1926, the bank was incorporated as the Washington Rock Building and Loan Association. Sixteen years later, its name changed to Investors Savings and Loan Association. Through mergers, acquisitions, and internal expansion, the bank grew and eventually changed its name to Investors Savings Bank.

In 1997, Investors changed from a New Jersey-chartered mutual savings bank to a New Jersey-chartered stock savings bank, and reorganized as a two-tiered holding company. The bank became a wholly owned subsidiary of Investors Bancorp, Inc., a Delaware-chartered, mid-tier stock holding company, and Investors Bancorp Inc. became a wholly owned subsidiary of Investors Bancorp MHC.

In 2005, Investors Bancorp Inc. became a partially public company, trading common stock on the NASDAQ. In 2011, the bank rebranded itself and changed its name to Investors Bank. On May 8, 2014, Investors Bancorp became a fully public company.

Investors Bank was acquired by Citizens Financial Group in 2022. By February 28, 2023, all Investors locations became part of the Citizens network.

Acquisitions
1942: Millburn Building and Loan Association
1943: Connecticut Farms Building and Loan Association, Battle Hill Building and Loan Association
1947: Brick Church Savings and Loan Association
1958: Lyons Farms Building and Loan Association
1963: Divident Hill Savings and Loan Association
1969: Plainfield Savings and Loan Association
1973: Camptown Savings and Loan Association
1977: Supreme Savings and Loan Association
1991: East Jersey Savings Bank
1995: five Carteret Federal Savings Bank branches
2008: Summit Federal Savings Bank
2009: American Bank of New Jersey, six Banco Popular branches in New Jersey 
2010: seventeen Millennium BCP Bank branches (entire US operations; four branches were later sold by Investors Bank)  
2012: Brooklyn Federal Savings Bank, Marathon Bank
2013: Roma Bank, RomAsia Bank
2014: GCF Bank
2019: Gold Coast Bank
2021: eight New Jersey and eastern Pennsylvania branches of Berkshire Bank

References

External links 
 Company Site

Companies formerly listed on the Nasdaq
Banks based in New Jersey
American companies established in 1926
Banks established in 1926
Companies based in Essex County, New Jersey
Millburn, New Jersey
2005 initial public offerings
1926 establishments in New Jersey
American corporate subsidiaries
2022 mergers and acquisitions